The following is a list of teams that participated on the 2015–16 World Curling Tour.

Men's teams
Skips listed only

A-B
 Shinya Abe
 Carson Ackerman
 Jason Ackerman
 Josh Adams
 Shawn Adams
 Guy Algot
 Artur Ali
 Coard Allard
 Sam Antila
 Tomoji Arai
 Trevor Archibald
 Rob Atkins
 Felix Attinger
 Josh Bahr
 Scott Bailey
 Ray Baker
 Kurt Balderston
 Greg Balsdon
 Christian Bangerter
 Richard Barker
 Alexander Baumann
 Ken Bavis
 Mathieu Beaufort
 Travis Belchior
 Mark Bice
 Simon Biedermann
 Todd Birr
 Scott Bitz
 Greg Blyde
 Dimitri Boada
 David Bohn
 Dennis Bohn
 Adam Boland
 John Bolton
 Trevor Bonot
 Brendan Bottcher
 Emery Boucher
 Jim Brackett
 Doug Bewer
 Tom Brewster
 Richard Brower
 Craig Brown
 Rolf Burggmann
 Jed Brundidge
 Cameron Bryce
 Randy Bryden
 Robin Brydone
 Bryan Burgess

C
 Mike Callaghan
 Braden Calvert
 Mac Calwell
 Darren Camm
 Robert Campbell
 Reid Carruthers
 Peter Case
 Adam Casey
 Alex Champ
 Jordan Chandler
 Brady Clark
 Hunter Clawsson
 Adam Cocks
 Jared Collie
 Robert Collins
 Moray Combe
 Rene Comeau
 Scott Comfort
 Joseph Comte
 Brandon Corbett
 Denis Cordick
 Jim Cotter
 Dale Craig
 Wes Craig
 Warren Cross
 Jeff Currie
 Neil Currie

D-E
 Chad Dahlseide
 Jamie Danbrook
 Neil Dangerfield
 Alan Darragh
 Sean Davidson
 Peter de Cruz
 Antonio De Mollinedo
 Nicholas Deagle
 Ryan Deis
 Dayna Deruelle
 Paul Dexter
 Grant Dezura
 Ian Dickie
 William Dion
 Jaap van Dorp
 Colin Dow
 Mitch Downey
 Tyler Drews
 Korey Dropkin
 Stephen Dropkin
 Andrey Drozdov
 Matt Dunstone
 Kelsey Dusseault
 Mike Eberle
 Niklas Edin
 John Epping
 Alexander Eremin
 Jeff Erickson
 Gustav Eskilsson
 Wayne Ewasko

F-G
 Mike Farbelow
 Dale Fellows
 Pete Fenson
 Riley Fenson
 Pat Ferris
 Ian Fitzner-Leblanc
 Mike Flemming
 Alex Forrest
 Michael Fournier
 Adam Freilich
 Rhett Friesz
 Hiroshi Fukui
 Greg Gallagher
 Juraj Gallo
 Ben Gamble
 Chris Gardner
 Sean Geall
 Brent Gedak
 Bob Genoway
 Dale Gibbs
 Jeff Ginter
 Chris Glibota
 Geoff Goodland
 Glenn Goss
 James Grattan
 Brent Gray
 Colin Griffith
 Ritvars Gulbis
 Brad Gushue

H
 Al Hackner
 Glen Hanson
 Grant Hardie
 Mike Harris
 Tyler Harris
 Kody Hartung
 Jeremy Harty
 Paul Harvey
 Corry Heggestad
 Brad Heidt
 Josh Heidt
 Guy Hemmings
 Jan Hess
 Yves Hess
 Lloyd Hill
 Nich Hilton
 Kosuke Hirata
 Markus Høiberg
 Mark Homan
 Tanner Horgan
 Daryl Horsman
 Will House
 Glenn Howard
 Kevin Hrab
 Carroll Huntress
 Justin Huri
 Rayad Hussain
 Mike Hutchings
 Ryan Hyde
 Tom Hyde

I-K
 Tsukafumi Ikehata
 Andrew Irving
 Bill Irwin
 Steve Irwin
 Kenji Iwasaki
 Bret Jackson
 Matt Jackson
 Brad Jacobs
 Jason Jacobson
 Borys Jasiecki
 Willie Jeffries
 Dean Joanisse
 Michael Johnson
 Dylan Johnston
 Josh Johnston
 Shawn Joyce
 Paddy Käser
 Kevin Kakela
 Junpei Kanda
 Arihito Kasahara
 Aku Kauste
 Mark Kean
 Kris Keating
 Doug Kee
 Reto Keller
 Harvey Kelts
 Mike Kennedy
 Kalle Kiiskinen
 Kim Min-woo
 Kim Soo-hyuk
 Viktor Kim
 Jamie King
 Dean Kleiter
 Tyler Klymchuk
 Jamie Koe
 Kevin Koe
 Colin Koivula
 Jared Kolomaya
 Kenji Komoda
 Nobukazu Komoribayashi
 Parker Konschuh
 Bruce Korte
 Richard Krell
 Hiromitsu Kurimaya

L
 Damien Lahiton
 Paul Landry
 Tyler Lautner
 Steve Laycock
 Ryan LeDrew
 Lee Ki-bok
 Alex Leichter
 Ryan Lemoine
 Mike Libbus
 John Likely
 John Lilla
 Liu Chenhao
 Liu Rui
 Mick Lizmore
 Lionel Locke
 Trevor Loreth
 Thomas Love
 William Lyburn

M
 Craig MacAlpine
 Ewan MacDonald
 Brent MacDougall
 Glen MacLeod
 Scott MacLeod
 Dominik Märki
 Jeremy Mallais
 Matthew Manuel
 Kelly Marnoch
 Bert Martin
 Nathan Martin
 Chase Martyn
 Sinpei Matsumoto
 Hayato Matsumura
 Codey Maus
 Todd Maxwell
 Robert Mayhew
 Curtis McCannell
 Bruce McConnell
 Heat McCormick
 Ryan McCrady
 Gary McCullough
 Patrick Mcdonald
 Miike McEwen
 Michael McGaugh
 Taylor McIntyre
 Mike McLean
 Shaun Meachem
 Tim Meadows
 Jon Medure
 Terry Meek
 Jean-Michel Ménard
 Dave Merklinger
 Pascal Michaud
 Sven Michel
 Eirik Mjøn
 Dustin Montpellier
 Josh Moore
 Tony Moore
 Dennis Moretto
 Pierre-Luc Morissette
 Tasuhiro Morita
 Yusuke Morozumi
 Tim Morrison
 Bruce Mouat
 Darren Moulding
 Matthew Mourot
 Steven Munroe
 Richard Muntain
 David Murdoch
 Jamie Murphy

N-R
 Gyeorgy Nagy
 Hideaki Nakamura
 Andrew Nerpin
 Sean O'Connor
 Alan O'Leary
 Meico Öhninger
 Ryo Ogihara
 Satoshi Okada
 Derek Oryniak
 Fritz Oswald
 Kevin Park
 Ian Parker
 Aliaksei Parkhutsik
 Matt Paul
 Rick Perron
 Daley Peters
 James Pougher
 Guy Racette
 Scott Ramsay
 Bendik Ramsfjell
 Tomi Rantamaki
 Jon Rennie
 Rob Retchless
 Joel Retornaz
 Jason Roach
 Mike Robinson
 Roland Robinson
 Brent Ross
 Rick Rowsell
 Roman Ruch
 J. T. Ryan

S
 Kevin Saccary
 Tom Sallows
 Wayne Sangster
 Makoto Sato
 Brandon Scheel
 Stephen Schneider
 Felix Schulze
 Yannick Schwaller
 Kim-Lloyd Sciboz
 Thomas Scoffin
 Tom Scott
 Seong Se-hyeon
 Seong Yu-jin
 Daryl Shane
 Ray Sharp
 Graham Shaw
 Randie Shen
 Michael Shepherd
 John Shuster
 Lyle Sieg
 Steen Sigurdson
 David Sik
 Pat Simmons
 Trent Skanes
 Bob Smallwood
 Greg Smith
 Kyle Smith
 Matthew Smith
 Scott Smith
 Tucker Smith
 Jiri Snitil
 Darryl Sobering
 Jon St. Denis
 Jesse St. John
 John Steel
 Shea Steele
 Chad Stevens
 Brayden Stewart
 Rasmus Stjerne
 Andrew Stopera
 John Stroh
 Karsten Sturmay
 Dave Sullivan
 Marc Suter
 Andrew Symonds

T-W
 Naomasa Takeda
 Wayne Tallon
 Yasumasa Tanida
 Tyler Tardi
 Andrew Taylor
 Stuart Taylor
 Charley Thomas
 Colin Thomas
 Stuart Thompson
 Greg Todoruk
 Stephen Trickett
 Satoru Tsukamoto
 Wayne Tuck, Jr.
 Martin Udh Gronbech
 Thomas Ulsrud
 Kazuhisa Unoura
 Markku Uusipaavalniemi
 Tyler van Amsterdam
 Jason Vaughan
 Brett Vavrek
 Darrel Veiner
 Benoit Vezeau
 Brock Virtue
 Shane Vollman
 Jake Walker
 Scott Webb
 Wade White
 Jessi Wilkinson
 Chris Wimmer
 Evan Workin
 Rasmus Wrana
 Sebastian Wunderer
 Kevin Wunderlin

Y-Z
 Kevin Yablonski
 Matt Yeo
 Yoo Hyun-jun
 Aaron Young
 John Young, Jr.
 Matt Zachary
 Michal Zdenka
 Zhang Ze Zhong

Women's teams
Skips listed only

A-B
 Melissa Adams
 Gina Aitken
 Karina Aitken
 Jennifer Allan
 Emily Anderson
 Sherry Anderson
 LeAnne Andrews
 Federica Apollonio
 Meghan Armit
 Mary-Anne Arsenault
 Cathy Auld
 Greta Aurell
 Diana Backer
 Megan Balsdon
 Brett Barber
 Melanie Barbezat
 Penny Barker
 Shannon Birchard
 Suzanne Birt
 Santa Blumbergs
 Marilyn Bodogh
 Shelly Bradley
 Theresa Breen
 Emily Brekke
 Meaghan Brezden
 Chantele Broderson
 Jill Brothers
 Corryn Brown
 Erika Brown
 Joelle Brown
 Laura Burtnyk
 Celeste Butler-Rohland
 Nicole Butler-Rohland

C-D
 Chrissy Cadorin
 Jolene Campbell
 Chelsea Carey
 Alexandra Carlson
 Cory Christensen
 Nadine Chyz
 Cristin Clark
 Jennifer Clark-Rouire
 Kelly Cochrane
 Katie Cottrill
 Stacie Curtis
 Sarah Daniels
 Courtney de Winter
 Janais DeJong
 Evgeniya Demkina
 Kim Dennis
 Alyssa Despins
 Jackie Dewar
 Alexa Dixon
 Kim Dolan
 Holly Donaldson
 Dong Zi Qi
 Norma Douglass
 Daniela Driendl
 Coralie Duchemin
 Madeleine Dupont
 Kelsey Dutton
 Emily Dwyer

E-G
 Kerri Einarson
 Michelle Englot
 Mary Fay
 Binia Feltscher
 Kourtney Fesser
 Sandy Fister
 Allison Flaxey
 Hannah Fleming
 Shalon Fleming
 Tracy Fleury
 Karynn Flory
 Anna Fowler
 Susan Froud
 Satsuki Fujisawa
 Kerry Galusha
 Christie Gamble
 Jaimee Gardner
 Courtney George
 Amy Gibson
 Courtney Gilder
 Gim Un-chi
 Lisa Gisler
 Brooke Godsland
 Shelly Graham
 Lauren Gray
 Diane Gushulak

H-J
 Teryn Hamilton
 Heidi Hanlon
 Jenn Hanna
 Shelley Hardy
 Jacqueline Harrison
 Michelle Hartwell
 Janet Harvey
 Winter Harvey
 Anna Hasselborg
 Julie Hastings
 Ursi Hegner
 Kellie Henricks
 Patty Hersikorn
 Sarah Hill
 Rachel Homan
 Lauren Horton
 Hwang Su-bin
 Rina Ida
 Danielle Inglis
 Nancy Inglis
 Sophie Jackson
 Virginia Jackson
 Michèle Jäggi
 Jang Hye-ji
 Jiang Xindi
 Colleen Jones
 Jennifer Jones

K-L
 Jessie Kaufman
 Nicky Kaufman
 Oona Kauste
 Mioko Kawasaki
 Mallory Kean
 Kim Eun-jung
 Kim Ji-suk
 Kim Su-ji
 Cathy King
 Mizuki Kitaguchi
 Chaelynn Kitz
 Shannon Kleibrink
 Patti Knezevic
 Touri Koana
 Tina Kozak
 Anna Kubeskova
 Kerry Lackie
 Patti Lank
 Marie-France Larouche
 Stefanie Lawton
 Cassandra Lewin
 Kristy Lewis
 Abigayle Lindgren
 Kim Link
 Liu Sijia
 Terri Loblaw
 Towe Lundman

M
 Ineta Maca
 Kristen MacDiarmid
 Christine MacKay
 Isabelle Maillard
 Lindsay Markichuk
 Srah Mallais
 Lauren Mann
 Jodi Marthaller
 Nancy Martin
 Chana Martineau
 Alisha Mathis
 Mary Mattatall
 Cheryl McBain
 Krista McCarville
 Nancy McConnery
 Deb McCreanor
 Kristy McDonald
 Julie McEvoy
 Janet McGhee
 Carina McKay-Saturino
 Tiffany McLean
 Joyance Meechai
 Mei Jie
 Lisa Menard
 Sherry Middaugh
 Victorya Moiseeva
 Amanda Moizis
 Maile Mölder
 Michelle Montford
 Kristie Moore
 Monica Moriarty
 Erin Morrissey
 Eve Muirhead
 Morgan Muise
 Katie Murray

N-R
 Lene Nielsen
 Kyoko Nishizawa
 Jocelyn Nix
 Susan O'Connor
 Norma O'Leary
 Ayumi Ogasawara
 Sherrilee Orsted
 Pam Osborne
 Cecilia Östlund
 Cathy Overton-Clapham
 Alina Pätz
 Dorottya Palancsa
 Kalynn Park
 Barb Payette
 Roxane Perron
 Tina Persinger 
 Samantha Peters
 Beth Peterson
 Tanya Phillips
 Christine Pierce
 Colleen Pinkney
 Stephanie Prinse
 Geri-Lynn Ramsay
 Cheryl Reed
 Evita Regza
 Jacki Rintoul
 Rebecca Roberts
 Darcy Robertson
 Sylvie Robichaud
 Kelsey Rocque
 Caitlin Romain
 Jessica Ronalds
 Nina Roth
 Karin Rudstrom
 Melissa Runing
 Amanda Russett
 Ryu Young-iu

S-T
 Natsuki Saito
 Tanja Santschi
 Bobbie Sauder
 Casey Scheidegger
 Kim Schneider
 Andrea Schöpp
 Jessica Schultz
 Kelly Scott
 Mandy Selzer
 Emi Shimizu
 Anna Sidorova
 Margaretha Sigfridsson
 Robyn Silvernagle
 Jamie Sinclair
 Kristin Skaslien
 Kayla Skrlik
 Barb Spencer
 Elena Stern
 Kristen Streifel
 Rebecca Stretch
 Heather Strong
 Selena Sturmay
 Valerie Sweeting
 Marta Szeliga-Frynia
 Nozomi Tamura
 Sena Tamura
 Shannon Tatlock
 Olga Ten
 Karla Thompson
 Jill Thurston
 Julie Tippin
 Silvana Tirinzoni
 Brooke Tokarz
 Kai Tsuchiya
 Ayano Tuchiya

U-Z
 Terry Ursel
 Stephanie Van Huyse
 Kesa Van Osch
 Rhonda Varnes
 Lana Vey
 Adela Walczak
 Wang Xueyi
 Sarah Wark
 Kristy Watling
 Ashley Waye
 Riley Weagant
 Becca Wood
 Isabella Wranå
 Yan Xue Qi
 Nola Zingel

References
Men's teams - Archived from March 4, 2016
Women's teams - Archived from March 14, 2016

Teams
2015 in curling
2016 in curling
World Curling Tour teams